Secrets is the sixth studio album by guitarist Allan Holdsworth, released in 1989 through Intima Records; a remastered edition was reissued in 2008 through Eidolon Efformation. The album features drummer Vinnie Colaiuta, rather than regular collaborator Chad Wackerman; Wackerman did, however, write and perform drums on the song "Peril Premonition".

Critical reception

Vincent Jeffries at AllMusic awarded Secrets 4.5 stars out of 5, calling it "a true masterpiece" and "a triumph", whilst highlighting Holdsworth's "unreachable technical standard" and continued development of the SynthAxe.

In a 2013 interview with MusicRadar, Porcupine Tree drummer Gavin Harrison picked Secrets as one of ten "essential drum albums". He praised the drumming of Colaiuta, whom he described as "playing with wild abandon" as well as being "incredibly accurate." Patrick Mameli, guitarist and vocalist for death metal band Pestilence, called Secrets "the greatest fusion album ever recorded".

Track listing

Personnel
Allan Holdsworth – guitar, SynthAxe, spoken vocals (track 7), engineering, mixing, production
Rowanne Mark – vocals (track 2)
Craig Copeland – vocals (track 8)
Gary Husband – keyboard (track 1)
Steve Hunt – keyboard (tracks 4, 6)
Alan Pasqua – piano
Vinnie Colaiuta – drums (except track 7)
Chad Wackerman – drums (track 7), keyboard (track 7)
Jimmy Johnson – bass (except track 7)
Bob Wackerman – bass (track 7)
Claire Holdsworth – spoken vocals (track 7)

Technical
Jeffrey Ocheltree – sound effects
Robert Feist – engineering, mixing
Biff Vincent – engineering
Charlie Watts – engineering
Dan Humann – engineering
Bernie Grundman – mastering

References

External links
Secrets at therealallanholdsworth.com (archived)
Allan Holdsworth "Secrets" at Guitar Nine
In-depth interview about Secrets at the Allan Holdsworth Information Center

Allan Holdsworth albums
1989 albums